Pierre Louis Marie Bertran de Balanda (28 September 1887 – 28 March 1946) was a French horse rider who competed in the 1928 Summer Olympics.

He was born in Toulouse and died in Marseille.

In 1928, he and his horse Papillon won the silver medal in the individual jumping competition. They also finished fourth as part of the French jumping team in the team jumping competition.

External links 
 Pierre Bertran de Balanda's profile at databaseOlympics
 Pierre Bertran de Balanda's profile at Sports Reference.com

1887 births
1946 deaths
French male equestrians
French show jumping riders
Olympic equestrians of France
Equestrians at the 1928 Summer Olympics
Olympic silver medalists for France
Olympic medalists in equestrian
Medalists at the 1928 Summer Olympics